Fatema Tuzzahura (ফাতেমা তুজ্জহুরা) is a Bangladesh Awami League politician and the incumbent Member of Parliament from Reserved women's seat-21.

Career
Tuzzahura was elected to Parliament on 5 January 2014 from Reserved women's seat-21 as a Bangladesh Awami League candidate. Her husband is Anisur Rahman, Superintendent of Police of Narayanganj District.

Bangladesh Financial Intelligence Unit sought information on the banks accounts of Tuzzahura and her husband, Anisur Rahman in October 2019.

References

Awami League politicians
Living people
10th Jatiya Sangsad members
Year of birth missing (living people)
21st-century Bangladeshi women politicians
Women members of the Jatiya Sangsad